Zsolt Szilágyi may refer to:

 Zsolt Szilágyi (footballer) (born 1981), Romanian footballer of Hungarian descent 
 Zsolt Szilágyi (politician) (born 1968), Romanian politician Hungarian descent